Maraia Lum On is a former international lawn bowls competitor for Fiji.

Bowls career
Lum On started bowling in 1976 and was the 1982 Fiji Sportswoman of the Year. She had been inducted into the Fiji Sports Hall of Fame and in 1986 was the joint flag bearer for Fiji at the opening ceremony of the Commonwealth Games in Edinburgh, Scotland.

Lum On won the pairs silver medal with Willow Fong at the 1981 World Outdoor Bowls Championship in Toronto, Canada and four years later won the singles and pairs silver medal at the 1985 World Outdoor Bowls Championship in Melbourne, Australia.

She won four medals at the Asia Pacific Bowls Championships including two gold medals in the 1987 pairs, in Lae, Papua New Guinea and the 1989 pairs in Suva, Fiji.

References

Date of birth unknown
Fijian female bowls players
Bowls players at the 1982 Commonwealth Games
Bowls players at the 1986 Commonwealth Games
Commonwealth Games competitors for Fiji